Vladimir Korotkov defeated Georges Goven in the final, 6–2, 3–6, 6–2 to win the boys' singles tennis title at the 1965 Wimbledon Championships.

Draw

Finals

Top half

Top half

References

External links

Boys' Singles
1965